The 2011–12 season was Manchester City Football Club's 110th season of competitive football, 83rd season in the top flight of English football and 15th season in the Premier League. After finishing third in the league the previous season, the Blues qualified for the UEFA Champions League for only the second time in their history and the first since 1968–69, when the tournament was known as the European Cup.

The season was filled with ups and downs, but in the end it will be forever remembered as the one that brought Manchester City the long-awaited league title after a 44-year wait. City's third English top tier title was clinched on the final day of the season, after the Blues defeated Queens Park Rangers 3–2, coming back from being down 1–2 with two stoppage-time goals just before the final whistle. The championship marked City's first English title since 1968, as well as the first time the Premier League has been won by a club whose current spell in the top division began after the league commenced play. It was also the first Premier League title to be decided on goal difference, with City's game-winning goal against QPR coming 15 seconds after the final whistle blew in city rivals Manchester United's 1–0 win over Sunderland, which would otherwise have brought the title to the Reds.

Kit
Supplier: Umbro / Sponsor: Etihad Airways

Kit information
Umbro supplied kits for Manchester City for the third season in a row.

Home: The home kit for the 2011–12 season featured a striking "soundwave" graphic embedded on to the front of the shirt. The "soundwave" graphic took inspiration from the club's anthem, the Blue Moon, which was sung by fans on the match days. The shirt was combined with sky blue shorts for the first time since the 2006–07 season and with hooped socks.
Away: The away strip saw a return to the red-and-black stripes, the traditional Manchester City away colours that were famously introduced by the club's former co-manager Malcolm Allison in the 1960s. The most notable element of the strip was the position of the stripes on the arms, which was designed so that if a player scored and held his arms out horizontally whilst celebrating, the stripes would match up with the stripes on the body. The kit was embellished with gold applications and completed with black shorts and socks.
Third: Manchester City's navy away strip from the previous season was retained as a third kit and was worn with white shorts and socks in its only outing against Aston Villa.
Keeper: Umbro made two new goalkeeper strips for the 2011–12 season. The first choice kit was based on the design of the outfield home strip and included the "soundwave" graphic, but in dark green with light green detailing. The second choice kit was dark grey with white detailing, whilst the yellow/black outfit introduced in 2009–10 was retained as an alternative for its third season with yellow socks.

Friendlies

Pre-season games

World Football Challenge

Dublin Super Cup

Table

Fixtures

Competitions

FA Community Shield

Premier League

Matches

League table

Results summary

Points breakdown

Points at home: 55 
Points away from home: 34 

Points against 2010/11 Top Four: 12 
Points against promoted teams: 15

6 points: Aston Villa, Blackburn Rovers, Bolton Wanderers, Manchester United,
Newcastle United, Norwich City, Queens Park Rangers, Tottenham Hotspur
Wigan Athletic, Wolverhampton Wanderers
4 points: Fulham, Liverpool, Stoke City, West Bromwich Albion
3 points: Arsenal, Chelsea, Everton, Swansea City
1 point: Sunderland

Biggest & smallest
Biggest home win: 5–1 vs. Norwich City, 3 December 2011 
Biggest home defeat: Undefeated 
Biggest away win: 1–6 vs. Manchester United, 23 October 2011; vs. Norwich City, 14 April 2012 
Biggest away defeat: 5 by a 1-goal margin

Biggest home attendance: 47,435 vs. Queens Park Rangers, 13 May 2012 
Smallest home attendance: 46,321 vs. Stoke City, 21 December 2011 
Biggest away attendance: 75,487 vs. Manchester United, 23 October 2011 
Smallest away attendance: 16,026 vs. Wigan Athletic, 16 January 2012

Results by match

FA Cup

Football League Cup

UEFA Champions League

Group stage

UEFA Europa League

Knockout phase

Round of 32

Round of 16

Statistics

Squad information

Playing statistics

Appearances (Apps.) numbers are for appearances in competitive games only.
Apps. numbers denote: "no. of games started (no. of games subbed on)."
Red card numbers denote: "no. of second yellow cards / no. of straight red cards."
Numbers in parentheses represent red cards overturned for wrongful dismissal.

Statistics correct as of 13 May 2012

Goalscorers

Awards

Premier League Player of the Season award
Awarded to the outstanding player of the season as judged by a panel assembled by the Premier League's sponsor.

Premier League Manager of the Month award
Awarded monthly to the manager that was chosen by a panel assembled by the Premier League's sponsor.

Premier League Player of the Month award
Awarded monthly to the player that was chosen by a panel assembled by the Premier League's sponsor.

Premier League Golden Glove award
Awarded to the goalkeeper who kept the most clean sheets over the 2011–12 Premier League season.

PFA Team of the Year
The combined best 11 from all teams in the Premier League chosen by the PFA.

LMA Performance of the Week award
Awarded on a weekly basis to the Premier League or Football League team that a five-man LMA adjudication panel deems to have performed in some outstanding manner.

Etihad Player of the Year awards

Etihad Player of the Month awards
Awarded to the player that receives the most votes in a poll conducted each month on the official website of Manchester City.

2011 CAF African Footballer of the Year award
Awarded every calendar year from a shortlist of three based on a vote of the 53 CAF national team managers.

2011 FSS Serbian Player of the Year award
Awarded every calendar year in conjunction with the FSS Coach of the Year award.

Transfers and loans

Transfers in

Transfers out

Loans in

Loans out

References

2011–12
Manchester City
Manchester City
Manchester City
2011–12